Impens is a surname. Notable people with the surname include:

Clara Clairbert (born Clara Pierre Impens, 1899–1970), Belgian soprano
Christophe Impens (born 1969), Belgian athlete
Josse Impens (1840–1905), Belgian painter 
Ruben Impens (born 1971), Belgian cinematographer